Pieszkowice  is a village live  in the administrative district of Gmina Polkowice, within Polkowice County, Lower Silesian Voivodeship, in south-western Poland. Prior to 1945 it was in Germany.

References

Pieszkowice